Precious Memories Volume II is the eighteenth studio album and the second gospel album by American country music artist Alan Jackson. It was released on March 26, 2013, via Alan's Country Records and EMI Nashville. The album is a follow-up to Jackson's 2006 album Precious Memories. Of the album, Jackson said, "Denise and I had made a list of 30 to 40 songs to do for that first album. We had so many that we didn't get to, I thought we'd go in and do a few more just the same way - heartfelt and simple."

Reception
Precious Memories Volume ll debuted at No. 1 on Top Christian Albums, and No. 2 on Top Country Albums on chart date of April 13, 2013.  It sold 56,000 copies in the first week, only 7,000 of these were digital albums. The album has sold 453,200 copies in the United States as of October 2019.

The album won Top Christian Album at the 2014 Billboard Music Awards.

Track listing

Personnel
 Joe Combs - background vocals
 Ed Enoch - background vocals
 Tania Hancheroff - background vocals
 Travis Humbert - percussion
 Alan Jackson - lead vocals
 John Kelton - autoharp
 Steve Ladd - background vocals 
 Brent Mason - acoustic guitar
 Michael Means - background vocals
 Gary Prim - keyboards
 John Wesley Ryles - background vocals
 Keith Stegall - acoustic guitar
 Glenn Worf - bass guitar

Charts

Weekly charts

Year-end charts

References

2013 albums
Alan Jackson albums
EMI Records albums
Albums produced by Keith Stegall
Gospel albums by American artists